The second season of the MTV reality television series From G's to Gents premiered on February 10, 2009. The objective of the show is to make the transformation from a roughneck to a sophisticated gentleman. In the end, Mito was decided upon to be the most transformed and refined gentleman, winning the cash prize of $100,000 and membership in The Gentleman's Club. Blue, the runner-up, was inducted as a member into the Gentleman's Club as well.

Reason for elimination

Episode progress

Baron (Dirty) was supposed to be eliminated in Episode 1 for becoming too drunk to attend the chapter meeting, but Mr. Bentley decided to let him stay.

 The contestant won the competition.
 The contestant won the challenge and was safe from elimination.
 The contestant did not win the challenge but was safe from being eliminated.
 The contestant was at risk of being eliminated.
 The contestant's membership was denied.
 The contestant was on the carpet for elimination, but because of a problem at home Mr. Bentley allowed him to make the decision to leave or stay.
 The contestant didn't receive any blackballs, but was called down on the carpet by Mr. Bentley.
 The contestant won the challenge, but wasn't safe from elimination.

 Number after status indicates number of Black Balls received in voting.
 The contestant in italic text was chosen by the captain of the losing team of the challenge to be up for elimination.
 The contestant in bold text was chosen by the captain of the winning team of the challenge to be safe.

Episodes

Down 'N Dirty
First aired February 10, 2009

Bottom 3: A.D., Riff Raff, Macho.
Eliminated: Riff Raff.

Slip of the Tongue
First aired February 24, 2009

Guest appearance: Chamillionaire
Bottom 4: Jojo, A.D., A-Felon, Macho.
Eliminated: Jojo, A.D., A-Felon.

Waltz It Out
First Aired: March 3, 2009

Guest Appearance: Esther Baxter
Bottom 3: Protégé, Macho, Fahim
Eliminated: Macho

The Grizzly Gang
First Aired: March 10, 2009

Bottom 4: Mito, Teddy, Baron, Protégé
Eliminated: Protégé

The Model Boss
First aired March 17, 2009

Guest Appearance: E-40
Bottom 3: Mito, Fahim, Lank
Eliminated: Fahim

Boyz in the Wood
First aired March 24, 2009

Bottom 3: Teddy, Blue, All In
Eliminated: All In

Party Like a Gentleman
First aired March 31, 2009

Guest Appearance: Faith Evans
Bottom 3: Teddy, Baron, Lank
Eliminated: Lank

Pimps, Ho's, and Family Time
Originally Aired: April 7, 2009

 Bottom Two: Teddy, Baron
 Eliminated: Baron

Season 2 Reunion
Originally Aired: April 14, 2009

A Gentleman at Last
Originally Aired: April 14, 2009

 Bottom Two: Teddy, Mito
 Eliminated: Teddy
 Winner: Mito
 Runner-up: Blue

Season 2: After Show
Originally Aired: April 14, 2009

References

External links
 Official site

2009 American television seasons